In  the Nippon Professional Baseball season ended with the Chiba Lotte Marines of the Pacific League defeating the Hanshin Tigers of the Central League in a four-game sweep in the Nippon Series.

Format

Central League
 Season Format
 Regular Season
 Regular Season 1st place is the champion

Pacific League
 Season Format
 Regular Season
 Playoff 1st Stage: Regular Season 2nd place vs. Regular Season 3rd place – Best of 3
 Playoff 2nd Stage: Regular Season 1st place vs. Playoff 1st Stage winner – Best of 5
 Playoff 2nd Stage winner is the champion

Japan Series
 Central League champion vs. Pacific League champion – Best of 7

Standings

Central League

Regular season

Pacific League

Regular season

Playoff 1st Stage
Chiba Lotte Marines (2) vs. Seibu Lions (0)

Playoff 2nd Stage
Fukuoka SoftBank Hawks (2) vs. Chiba Lotte Marines (3)

Japan Series

Leaders

Batting

Pitching

Awards

Best Nine Awards

Central League

Pacific League

Gold Gloves

Central League

Pacific League

See also
2005 Major League Baseball season

References